This is a list of the first women lawyer(s) and judge(s) in the U.S. state of Washington. It includes the year in which the women were admitted to practice law (in parentheses). Also included are women who achieved other distinctions such becoming the first in their state to graduate from law school or become a political figure.

Firsts in Washington's history

Lawyers 

 First female: Mary Leonard (1885) 
 First Jewish American female: Bella Weretnikow Rosenbaum (1901) 
First Filipino American female: Dolores Sibonga (1973) 
First female quadriplegic: Holly Caudill (1995)

Law Clerks 

 First female to clerk for the Washington State Court of Appeals, Division III: Victoria L. Vreeland 
 First female to clerk for the Supreme Court of Washington: Susan Carlson in 2016

State judges 

 First female (justice of the peace): Mildred Henthorn Hamill in 1911 
 First female: Reah Whitehead (1893)in 1914 
First Latino American female: Carmen Otero in 1980 
 First female (Washington Supreme Court): Carolyn R. Dimmick (1953) in 1981 
 First African American female (municipal court): Norma S. Huggins in 1983
 First African American female (superior court): Norma S. Huggins in 1988
 First Asian American female: C. Kimi Kondo in 1991 
First female (Chief Justice; Washington Supreme Court): Barbara Durham in 1995
First Korean American (female): Mariane Spearman in 1999
First Iranian American (female): Susan Amini in 2013
First Asian American, Latino American, and openly lesbian (female) (Washington Supreme Court): Mary Yu (1993) in 2014 
First (African American) openly lesbian female (superior court): Helen Whitener (1998) in 2015
First (African American) openly lesbian female (Washington Supreme Court): Helen Whitener (1998) in 2020
First Native American (Pueblo of Isleta/Pueblo of Laguna) (female) (Washington Supreme Court): Raquel Montoya-Lewis in 2020 
First South Asian female: Kuljinder Dhillon in 2021

Federal judges 
First female (U.S. District Court for the Eastern District of Washington): Rosanna M. Peterson (1991) 
First Asian American (female) (U.S. District Court for the Western District of Washington): Tana Lin in 2021  
First Native American (female) (United States District Court for the Western District of Washington): Lauren J. King in 2021

Attorney General of Washington 

 First female: Christine Gregoire (1977) from 1993-2004

Assistant Attorney General 

 First female: June Fowles in 1939

Deputy Attorney General 

First female: Christine Gregoire (1977) in 1981

United States Attorney 

Jenny Durkan (1986): First openly LGBT female appointed as a U.S. Attorney in Washington (2009)
Vanessa Waldref: First female to serve as the United States Attorney for the Eastern District of Washington (2021)

Assistant United States Attorney 

 Holly Caudill: First female quadriplegic to work as an Assistant United States Attorney in Washington (1995)

Political Office 

First female (Washington State Senate): Reba Hurn (1910) from 1923-1930 
Jenny Durkan (1986): First openly LGBT female (a lawyer) elected as the Mayor of Seattle, Washington (2017)
Laurie Jinkins (1990): First openly LGBT female (a lawyer) elected as a Member of the Washington House of Representatives from the Twenty-Seventh District (2011)

Washington State Bar Association 

 First female president: Elizabeth “Betty” Bracelin

Firsts in local history
 Kathryn Ann Mautz: First female judge in Eastern Washington
Charnelle Bjelkengren: First African American female judge in Eastern Washington (2019)
Carolyn Brown: First female to serve as a Judge of the Benton-Franklin Superior Court, Washington (1988)
 Norma Rodriguez: First Latino American female to serve as a Judge of the Benton-Franklin Superior Court, Washington (2022)
 Carol Wardell: First female judge in Chelan and Douglas Counties, Washington (1991)
Carol Fuller: First female to serve as a superior court judge in Mason and Thurston Counties, Washington (1979)
Susan Owens: First female judge in Clallam County, Washington
Lauren Erickson: First female appointed as a Judge of the Clallam County Superior Court, Washington (2019)
Barbara Johnson: First female judge in Clark County, Washington (1987)
 Camara Banfield: First African American (female) to serve as a Judge of the Clark County Superior Court (2021)
 Jill Johanson: First female appointed as a Judge of the Superior Court in Cowlitz County, Washington
 Eliza Forbes: First female Justice of the Peace in King County, Washington
 Carmen Otero: First Latino American female judge in King County, Washington
 Susan Amini: First Iranian American (female) to serve as a Judge of the King County Superior Court (2013)
 Leila Robinson Sawtelle (1882): First female lawyer in Seattle, Washington (King County, Washington, 1884)
Bella Weretnikow Rosenbaum (1901): First Jewish American female lawyer in Seattle, Washington [King County, Washington]
Othilia Carroll Beals: First female Justice of the Peace in Seattle, Washington [King County, Washington]
C. Kimi Kondo: First Asian American female to serve as a Judge of the Seattle Municipal Court in Washington (c. 1991)
Marcine Anderson: First female (and Asian American) elected as a Judge of the Shoreline District Court (King County, Washington; 2010)
Betty Fletcher: First female to serve as the President of the South King County Bar Association, Washington (1972)
Tracy Flood: First African American female judge in Kitsap County, Washington (2021)
Jo Anne Alumbaugh (1979): First female lawyer in Kittitas County, Washington
Joely O’Rourke: First female judge in Lewis County, Washington
 Helen Whitener (1998): First openly LGBT and African American female to serve as Judge of the Pierce County Superior Court, Washington (2015)
Diane Clarkson: First African American female (and African American in general) to serve as the President of the Tacoma-Pierce County Bar Association, Washington (2016)
Mary Robnett: First female to serve as the Prosecuting Attorney for Pierce County, Washington (2019)
Kay Trumbull (1974): First female Judge of the Superior Court in Snohomish County, Washington
Reba Hurn (1910): First female lawyer in Spokane, Washington [Spokane County, Washington]
Kathleen Taft (1935): First female judicial officer (a commissioner) in Spokane County, Washington (1950)
Kathleen O’Connor (1975): First female Judge of the Superior Court of Spokane County, Washington
Charnelle Bjelkengren: First African American female to become a Judge of the Superior Court of Spokane County, Washington (2019)
Julia W. Ker (1912): First female lawyer in Olympia, Washington. She was also the first female police judge in Washington and the U.S. (1926). [Thurston County, Washington]
Sally Elke: First female Justice of the Peace in Tumwater, Washington (1942) [Thurston County, Washington]
Carol Fuller: First female to serve as a superior court judge in Mason and Thurston Counties, Washington (1979)
Aurel M. Kelly (1949): First female lawyer in Walla Walla, Washington [Walla Walla County, Washington]
 Sandy Flores (2008): First Latin American female lawyer in Walla Walla County, Washington
 Raquel Montoya-Lewis: First Native American (Pueblo of Isleta/Pueblo of Laguna) female judge in Whatcom County, Washington (2015)
 Sonia Rodriguez True: First Latino American (female) to serve as a Commissioner (2020) and Judge (2022) of the Yakima County Superior Court

See also  

 List of first women lawyers and judges in the United States
 Timeline of women lawyers in the United States
 Women in law

Other topics of interest 

 List of first minority male lawyers and judges in the United States
 List of first minority male lawyers and judges in Washington

References 

Lawyers, Washington DC, first
Washington DC, first
Women, Washington, first
Women, Washington, first
Women in Washington (state)
Lists of people from Washington (state)
Washington (state) lawyers